The West African black turtle (Pelusios niger) is a species of turtle in the family Pelomedusidae. It is endemic to Africa, in Cameroon, Equatorial Guinea, Gabon, and Nigeria.

References

Bibliography 

 
 

West African black turtle
Reptiles of Cameroon
Reptiles of Equatorial Guinea
Reptiles of Gabon
Reptiles of Nigeria
Reptiles of West Africa
West African black turtle
Taxa named by André Marie Constant Duméril
Taxa named by Gabriel Bibron